August Leopold Crelle (17 March 1780 – 6 October 1855) was a German mathematician. He was born in Eichwerder near Wriezen, Brandenburg, and died in Berlin. He is the founder of Journal für die reine und angewandte Mathematik (also known as Crelle's Journal).  He befriended Niels Henrik Abel and published seven of Abel's papers in the first volume of his journal.

In 1841, he was elected a foreign member of the Royal Swedish Academy of Sciences. He was elected as a member to the American Philosophical Society in 1853.

References

External links

 Gabriele Dörflinger: Crelle, August Leopold (11.3.1780 - 6.10.1856), 2016

1780 births
1855 deaths
People from Wriezen
People from the Margraviate of Brandenburg
19th-century German mathematicians
Niels Henrik Abel
Members of the Prussian Academy of Sciences
Members of the Royal Swedish Academy of Sciences